Sophronisca grisea is a species of beetle in the family Cerambycidae. It was described by Per Olof Christopher Aurivillius in 1910.

Subspecies
 Sophronisca grisea grisea Aurivillius, 1910
 Sophronisca grisea subannulicornis Breuning, 1968

References

Desmiphorini
Beetles described in 1910